Anicius Probus Faustus Niger (floruit 490–512) was a politician of the Western Roman Empire who served as consul in 490 and as praetorian prefect of Italy from 509 to 512.

Life 
Faustus was the son of Gennadius Avienus, a member of an ancient and noble Roman family which traced back its origins to Marcus Valerius Messalla Corvinus, consul of the year 59. He is known to have two brothers, Rufius Magnus Faustus Avienus consul in 502, and Ennodius Messala consul in 506.

Faustus may be the same ex-consul Faustus mentioned in the Liber Pontificalis as the only aristocrat who supported Pope Symmachus in his conflict with Antipope Laurentius during the years 502–506.

Notes

Bibliography 
 

5th-century Romans
5th-century Roman consuls
Imperial Roman consuls
Anicii
Praetorian prefects of Italy